Job Corps is a program administered by the United States Department of Labor that offers free education and vocational training to young men and women ages 16 to 24.

Mission and purpose 

Job Corps' mission is to help young people ages 16 through 24 to improve the quality of their lives through vocational and academic training aimed at gainful employment and career pathways.

History 

The Job Corps was originally designed by a task force established by Labor Secretary Willard Wirtz reporting to his Manpower Administrator Sam Merrick. In 1962, the youth unemployment rate was twice the non-youth unemployment rate and the purpose of the initiative was to create a program whereby Youth members of the program could spend 1/2 of their time improving national parks and forests and the other 1/2 of their time improving their basic education skills which were severely limiting their occupational accomplishments.  The Job Corps Task Force initially recommended that Job Corps programs be limited to Federal National Parks, National Forests, and other Federal Lands.

By the Kennedy assassination in 1963, the Job Corps' operational plans, costs, and budgets had been well developed, including coordination with the U. S. Forest Service and the National Park Service, and Memoranda of Understanding (MOUs) executed among the agencies. Initiating legislation and budgetary authorizations were drafted by the Kennedy Administration and introduced in both houses of Congress.

When President Johnson and his planning staff decided on the War on Poverty, most of the proposed programs would take more than a year to even start. However the Job Corps idea was well along in the planning stage and could be deployed rapidly, so the Labor Department Job Corps Task Force was appointed to the Task force for the War on Poverty, and the Job Corps was slated to be the initial operational program.

Job Corps was therefore initiated as the central program of the Johnson Administration's War on Poverty, part of his domestic agenda known as the Great Society. Sargent Shriver, the first Director of the Office of Economic Opportunity, modeled the program on the Depression-era Civilian Conservation Corps (CCC). Established in the 1930s as an emergency relief program, the CCC provided room, board, and employment to thousands of unemployed young people. Though the CCC was discontinued after World War II, Job Corps built on many of its methods and strategies.

The first National Director of the Job Corps program was Dr. S. Stephen Uslan, who was appointed by President Lyndon Johnson and reported directly to Sargent Shriver.  The current national director of the Office of Job Corps is Rachel Torres.  The Job Corps program is currently authorized under Title I of the Workforce Innovation and Opportunity Act.

Since its inception in 1964 under the Economic Opportunity Act, Job Corps has served more than 1.9 million young people. Job Corps serves approximately 60,000 youths annually at Job Corps Centers throughout the country.

Eligibility 

A person is eligible for Job Corps if he or she meets the following criteria:

 Is a legal U.S. resident; lawfully admitted permanent resident alien, refugee, or asylee, or other immigrant who has been authorized by the U.S. attorney general to work in the United States; or resident of a U.S. territory.
  Meets low-income criteria.
  Is 16 to 24 years of age.°
  Does not have specific criminal convictions or active probation.
  Is in need of additional technical training, education, or related assistance to complete schoolwork or to find and keep a job.
  Has signed consent from a parent or guardian if he or she is a minor.
  Does not exhibit behavioral problems that could prevent them or others from experiencing Job Corps’ full benefits.
  Does not use prohibited drugs.

°Unless waived due to disability.

Phases of career development 

Applicants to the Job Corps program are identified and screened for eligibility by organizations contracted by the U.S. Department of Labor. Each student in the Job Corps goes through three stages of the program:

Career Preparation: This period focuses on the assimilation of the student to Job Corps academic assessment, health screening, career exploration, and instruction on career planning. This phase lasts for up to the first 60 days of enrollment.

Career Development: This period is where the student receives all vocational training, academic instruction, employability and social skills development, and driver's education.

Career Transition: The period is preceded by a focus on transition readiness, and is the phase of services that immediately follows a student after they leave Job Corps. Career Transition Specialists assist with job placement or searches, and provide support and referrals for housing, transportation, and other essential components of living needed by the former student to obtain and retain employment.

Career paths 

Career Technical Training programs (often called vocational programs) offered by Job Corps vary by campus location. In addition, Job Corps continually adjusts program offerings in response to labor market demand. Incoming students who do not already hold a high school diploma or equivalency may attain one while at Job Corps. Job Corps also offers opportunities to attain college credits and hold partnerships with community colleges. Visit www.jobcorps.gov for the most current information on training programs.

Locations 

There are a total of 121 Job Corps centers, including one in Washington, D.C. and two in Puerto Rico.

There are six Regional Offices of Job Corps:

 Atlanta Region
 Boston Region
 Chicago Region
 Dallas Region
 Philadelphia Region
 San Francisco Region

Evaluations 

In Program Year 2012, approximately 75 percent of Job Corps’ graduates were placed. Slightly more than 60 percent joined the workforce or enlisted in the military, while 13.5 percent of Job Corps’ graduates enrolled in education programs.

Notable Job Corps Members 
 Charles Bradley - American funk/soul/R&B singer, signed to Daptone Records
 George Foreman
 Mike Epps
 Joseph S. Murphy (1933-1998) - President of Queens College, President of Bennington College, and Chancellor of the City University of New York
 Christa Pike - Murderer of a fellow Job Corps Student

References

External links 

 

 
Great Society programs
Government agencies established in 1964
Alternative education
1964 establishments in the United States